Type 34 may refer to:
Volkswagen Type 34, a variant of the Volkswagen Karmann Ghia
Bugatti Type 34 U-16, a car produced by Bugatti
Slingsby Sky (Slingsby Type 34 Sky), a high performance single seat competition sailplane
Type 34, USAF reporting name for Beriev Be-6, a Soviet flying boat